The 1995 Dubai Tennis Championships was the third edition of this men's tennis tournament and was played on outdoor hard courts. The tournament was part of the World Series of the 1995 ATP Tour. It took place in Dubai, United Arab Emirates from 6 February through 13 February 1995. Fourth-seeded Wayne Ferreira won the singles title.

Finals

Singles

 Wayne Ferreira defeated  Andrea Gaudenzi, 6–3, 6–3
It was Ferreira's first title of the year and the eighth of his career.

Doubles
 Grant Connell /  Patrick Galbraith defeated  Tomás Carbonell /  Francisco Roig, 6–2, 4–6, 6–3

References

External links
ATP tournament profile
ITF tournament details

 
Dubai Tennis Championships
Dubai Tennis Championships
Dubai Tennis Championships